The Most Interesting Man in the World was an advertising campaign for  Dos Equis beer featuring actor Jonathan Goldsmith as a bearded, debonair older gentleman with voiceovers that were both humorous and outrageous. The advertisements first began appearing in the United States in 2006 and  became a popular Internet meme. The campaign ended in 2018.

History

The advertisements first began appearing in the United States in 2006, with The Most Interesting Man in the World portrayed by American actor Jonathan Goldsmith, and Frontline narrator Will Lyman providing voiceovers. They were produced by the marketing firm Euro RSCG (now Havas Worldwide) for Cuauhtémoc Moctezuma Brewery.

Goldsmith landed the Dos Equis gig by auditioning for the role. Auditioners were given the ending line "...and that's how I arm wrestled Fidel Castro" and asked to improvise. Goldsmith began his audition by removing one sock and then improvised for 30 minutes before reaching the concluding line. The character was inspired by his deceased sailing partner and friend Fernando Lamas.

In March 2016, Dos Equis announced Goldsmith's retirement from the role, with a commercial sending him on a one-way journey to Mars amid much acclaim, and the narration: "His only regret is not knowing what regret feels like". In September, they introduced French actor Augustin Legrand as Goldsmith's replacement.

The campaign was ended in 2018, and replaced with a new campaign called "Keep It Interesante".

Advertisements
The Goldsmith advertisements feature an older bearded, debonair gentleman. They also feature a montage (mostly in black and white) of daring exploits involving "the most interesting man" when he was younger, in which the character is played by actor Claudio Marangone.

The precise settings are never revealed, but he performs feats such as freeing an angry bear from a painful-looking bear trap, shooting a pool trick shot before an audience (by shooting the cue ball out of the mouth of a man lying on the pool table), catching a marlin while cavorting in a Hemingway-esque scene with a beautiful young woman, winning an arm-wrestling match in a South American setting, surfing a killer wave, and bench pressing two young women, each seated in a chair, in a casino setting. The voiceovers themselves are intended to be both humorous and outrageous, and include humorous undertones such as his giving his own father "the talk", experiencing an awkward moment just to know how it felt, and finding the Fountain of Youth but not drinking from it, "because he wasn't thirsty". Other feats are more centered on his physical abilities and personality. These include his small talk changing foreign policies, parallel-parking a train, and slamming a revolving door.

At the end of the advertisement, the most interesting man, usually shown sitting in a night club or other social setting surrounded by several beautiful young women, says, "I don't always drink beer. But when I do, I prefer Dos Equis." Each commercial ends with him stating the signature sign-off: "Stay thirsty, my friends."

There are secondary advertisements that are similar to the final part of the original advertisements. They feature the man sitting in a social setting, surrounded by beautiful young women, conveying a short opinion to the viewer on certain subjects, such as bar nuts, the two-party system, self-defense, trophy wives, and "bromance". He then finishes the advertisement by holding a Dos Equis beer and saying, "Stay thirsty, my friends."

The advertisements featuring Legrand end with a slightly different sign-off: "Stay thirsty, mis amigos" (Spanish for "my friends").

Sales strategy and results
The agency's rationale for the brand  strategy was defined as: "He is a man rich in stories and experiences, much the way the audience hopes to be in the future. Rather than an embodiment of the brand, The Most Interesting Man is a voluntary brand spokesperson: he and Dos Equis share a point of view on life that it should be lived interestingly." According to the company, U.S. sales increased each year between 2006–2010 and tripled in Canada in 2008, although exact figures were not provided. Sales of Dos Equis are said to have increased by 22% at a time when sale of other imported beer fell 4% in the U.S.

Goldsmith said in an interview that he realized how successful the campaign had been when a man came up to him in a restaurant, telling Goldsmith that the man had asked his young son what he wanted to be when he grew up, and the son replied: "I want to be The Most Interesting Man In The World." He also said he had been approached on the street because of his role by such figures as Michael Jordan, Leonardo DiCaprio and Jennifer Lawrence, and he was invited to meet former US President Barack Obama on several occasions.

In popular culture
The Most Interesting Man in the World has become an Internet meme, with a picture of The Most Interesting Man accompanying the phrasal template "I don't always [X], but when I do, [Y]".

On the September 22, 2012 airing of  Saturday Night Live, guest host Joseph Gordon-Levitt played the unimpressive son of The Most Interesting Man in the World in a pair of sketches, with Jason Sudeikis appearing as his father in the second.

Goldsmith briefly reprised his role as The Most Interesting Man in the World during an advertisement for Stella Artois. The commercial was first aired on February 4, 2019 during Super Bowl LIII.

Goldsmith also reprised the character in a series of commercials for Astral Tequila in 2019. In these commercials, Goldsmith’s character is informed by his young assistant that he has won some sort of argument or competition. Goldsmith’s character is usually interrupted while finishing some incredible task in his office. Upon hearing the good news, Goldsmith’s character then drops what he is doing, saying “this calls for Tequila”.  His young assistant adds “the best tequila”. Goldsmith’s character then sets down the bottle of tequila and looks at the camera, saying “Astral… tequila,” elongating the word “tequila”.

See also 
 Chuck Norris facts
 Bill Brasky

References

Advertising campaigns
Male characters in advertising
Drink advertising characters
American advertising slogans
Mascots introduced in 2006
Fictional salespeople
Internet memes
Snowclones
American television commercials
2000s television commercials
2010s television commercials